Nova is a rural locality (a village) in Irdomatskoye Rural Settlement, Cherepovetsky District, Vologda Oblast, Russia. The population was 60 as of 2002. There are 30 streets.

Geography 
Irdomatka is the nearest rural locality.

References 

Rural localities in Cherepovetsky District